Station Fire Memorial Park is a park located in the state of Rhode Island. It was created and dedicated following The Station nightclub fire that occurred on February 20, 2003, resulting in 100 deaths and 230 injuries, and is located on the same property where the fire took place. It was officially dedicated and opened to the public on May 21, 2017.

History

The park was created in memory of the victims affected by a nightclub fire that occurred on Thursday, February 20, 2003 in West Warwick, Rhode Island. The fire was caused by pyrotechnics set off by the tour manager of the evening's headlining band Great White, which ignited plastic foam used as sound insulation in the walls and ceilings surrounding the stage. As of May 2017, it is the fourth-deadliest nightclub fire in US history. It resulted in 100 deaths and 230 injuries. Many of the survivors developed posttraumatic stress disorder as a result of psychological trauma.

Following the investigation of the event, the site of the fire was cleared of all materials, structures, and debris, and a multitude of crosses were placed as memorials, left by loved ones of the deceased. On May 20, 2003, nondenominational services began to be held at the site of the fire for a number of months. Access remains open to the public, and memorial services are held each February 20. In June 2003, the Station Fire Memorial Foundation (SFMF) was formed with the purpose of purchasing the property in order to build and maintain a memorial for the victims of the event. In September 2012, the owner of the land, Ray Villanova, donated the property of the site to the SFMF. By April 2016, $1.65 million of the $2 million fundraising goal had been achieved and construction of the memorial had commenced. The memorial dedication ceremony took place on May 21, 2017.

References

Monuments and memorials in Rhode Island
The Station nightclub fire
Parks in Rhode Island